James Enlo Smith (September 29, 1930September 23, 2020) was Comptroller of the Currency of the United States from 1973 to 1976. Smith was born in Aberdeen, South Dakota.

James E. Smith was Deputy Under-Secretary of the Treasury before being named Comptroller by President Nixon. The explosive growth of banking in the 1960s and 1970s was changing the face of banking.

In response, Smith led a review of the agency's examination practices, which changed the way the agency did business: more emphasis was placed on assessment of a bank's own policies, procedures, decision making, and management information system, and the importance of training and career development for national bank examiners was recognized. After his resignation, Smith became a financial consultant. Smith died on September 23, 2020 at the age of 89.

References

1930 births
2020 deaths
United States Comptrollers of the Currency
Comptrollers in the United States
Members of the United States Assay Commission
Chairs of the Federal Deposit Insurance Corporation
Nixon administration personnel
Ford administration personnel